Pyroderces tethysella is a moth in the family Cosmopterigidae. It is found in Spain, Tunisia and Tadjikistan.

Adults have been recorded from mid August to the beginning of October.

References

External links

Moths described in 2003
tethysella